John Fischer may refer to:

 John Fischer (painter) (1786–1875), German painter
 John Fischer (baseball) (1855–1942), Major League pitcher and first baseman
 John Henry Fischer (1910–2009), academic administrator in Baltimore
 Johnny Fischer (1912–1984), American golfer
 John Fischer (pianist) (1930–2016), jazz pianist
 John Fischer (politician) (born 1947), Australian
 John Fischer (judge) (born 1948), Oklahoma Court of Civil Appeals
 John Martin Fischer (born 1952), professor of philosophy at the University of California, Riverside
 John Fischer, mayor of Anaheim, California, 1876–1877

See also 
John Fisher (disambiguation)
Johann Fischer (disambiguation)